Aurora, Colorado, held an election for mayor on November 5, 2019. It saw the election of Mike Coffman.

Incumbent mayor Bob LeGare, who assumed the office following the death in office of Steve Hogan, did not seek reelection.

Candidates
Marsha Berzins, Aurora City Council member from Ward 3
Mike Coffman, former United States Congressman from Colorado's 6th congressional district (2009—2019), former Secretary of State of Colorado (2007—2009), former Colorado State Treasurer (1999—2005; 2006—2007), former member of the Colorado House of Representatives from the 40th district (1993—1994), former member of the Colorado House of Representatives from the 49th district (1989—1993)
Ryan Frazier, former at-large Aurora City Council member
Tiffany Grays (write-in candidate)
Omar Montgomery, President of the Aurora chapter of the NAACP and director of educational opportunity programs at the University of Colorado Denver
Rennie Peterson, former Aurora City Council member from Ward 2 (2005—2017)

Campaign
Candidates collectively raised more than $1 million in contributions.

General election 
The results were not immediately clear on election night, as more than 1,000 ballots had unsettled signature discrepancies. This was enough that Coffman's apparent margin of victory over Montgomery could be overcome. The counting of ballots ended on November 14, and Montgomery formally conceded on November 17.

Results

References 

Aurora
Mayoral elections in Aurora, Colorado
Aurora, Colorado